Kazimierz Kurzawski (born 29 October 1942) is a Polish former sports shooter. He competed in the 50 metre pistol event at the 1964 Summer Olympics.

References

1942 births
Living people
Polish male sport shooters
Olympic shooters of Poland
Shooters at the 1964 Summer Olympics
Sportspeople from Poznań